Sebastian Blanck (born July 18, 1976) is an American musician and figurative painter, best known for his work with the band Black Dice and later his paintings.

Work

Early life 
Blanck was born in 1976 in New Haven, Connecticut, to Maggie Land and Dr. Thomas J.J. Blanck, a professor and chairman of the Department of Anesthesiology at New York University Hospital. He received a B.F.A. in painting from the Rhode Island School of Design in 1998. In 2001, he was a visiting artist at the American Academy in Rome. In 2003 Sebastian Blanck married artist Isca Greenfield-Sanders, with family friend Lou Reed officiating the wedding.

Music 
In the late 1990s, he became a founding member of the experimental electronica group Black Dice along with Bjorn Copeland, Hisham Bharoocha and Eric Copeland. Blanck has worked as a composer for short films and documentaries including; Thinking XXX (2004), Ghosts of Grey Gardens (2005), About Face: Supermodels Then and Now (2012) and more. After Blanck left Black Dice to focus on painting, he returned to music, but veered away from his former band's electronic aesthetic. On June 22, 2010, Blanck released an unplugged, folk, solo album called Alibi Coast on Rare Book Room Records.

Visual art 
Blanck is based out of New York City. He has had solo exhibitions at Baldwin Gallery in Aspen Colorado, Bjorn Wetterling Gallery in Stockholm and Werkstatte Gallery in New York.

References

External links 

 Sebastian Blanck on Artnet

1976 births
Living people
20th-century American painters
American male painters
21st-century American painters
21st-century American male artists
Rhode Island School of Design alumni
20th-century American printmakers
20th-century American male artists
Rhode Island School of Design alumni in music